Stereum sanguinolentum is a species of fungus in the Stereaceae family. A plant pathogen, it causes red heart rot, a red discoloration on conifers, particularly spruces or Douglas-firs. Fruit bodies are produced on dead wood, or sometimes on dead branches of living trees. They are a thin leathery crust of the wood surface. Fresh fruit bodies will bleed a red-colored juice if injured, reflected in the common names bleeding Stereum or the bleeding conifer parchment. It can be the host of the parasitic jelly fungus Tremella encephala.

Taxonomy
The species was first described scientifically by Albertini and Schweinitz in 1805 as Thelephora sanguinolenta. Other genera to which it has been transferred throughout its taxonomical history include Phlebomorpha, Auricularia, Merulius, and Haematostereum. The fungus is commonly known as the "bleeding Stereum" or the "bleeding conifer parchment".

Description
The fruit body of Stereum sanguinolentum manifests itself as a thin (typically less than 1 mm thick) leathery crust on the surface of the host wood. Often, the upper edge is curled to form a narrow shelf (usually less than 10 mm thick). When present, these shelves can be fused to or overlap neighboring shelves. The surface of the fruit body consists of a layer of fine felt-like hairs, sometimes pressed flat against the surface. The color ranges from beige to buff to dark brown in mature specimens; the margin are lighter-colored. Fresh fruit bodies that are injured exude a red juice, or will bruise a red color if touched. The fruit bodies dry to a greyish-brown color. The spores are ellipsoid to cylindrical, amyloid, and typically measure 7–10 by 3–4.5 µm.

Stereum sanguinolentum can be parasitized by the jelly fungus Tremella encephala.

Symptoms
Stereum sanguinolentum is a basidiomycete that causes both brown rot and white rot on conifers. The primary symptom is the red streaking discoloration. It is a white rot basidiomycete that causes an extensive decay resulting from wounds, logging extractions, bark peeking, or branch pruning. Stereum sanguinolentum forms territorial clones while spreading by vegetative growths between spatially separated resource units; Armillaria spp, Heterobasidion annosum, Phellinus weirii, Inonotus tomentosus, and Phellinus noxius all work with Stereum sanguinolentum to attack the host. The combinations of these pathogens work together to form territorial clones that can cover up to several hectares and survive for hundreds of years while infecting trees.

White rot causes a gradual decrease in cellulose as the decay continues to affect the tree. The white rot fungi consume the segments of cellulose that are released during the decay as quickly as they are produced. White rot is also known as “wound rot of spruce” and is when the spores create open wounds on the host.

In Brown Rot, the cellulose is degraded. The rapid decrease in cellulose chain length implies that the catalyst that facilitates the depolymerization readily gains access to cellulose chains.

Life cycle
Stereum sanguinolentum is an amphithallic basidiomycete. Monospore intrabasidiome pairings are always compatible when reproducing making it easy for the fungus to spread. The monobasidiospore and trama isolates are plurinucleate and bear clamp connections and are often dikaryotic. Basidiospores are heterokikaryotic indicating that they are amphithallic. The mycelia that spreads the fungi grow from the heterodikaryotic spores that originate from the basidiospores. Either mating between homokaryons originating from the monokaryotic basidiospores or by the parasexual process results in recombination.

Stereum snaguinolentum is an extremely fast colonizer of newly dead or wounded conifer sapwood. Being amphithallic allows this cycle to have selective advantages upon such organisms by enhancing survival and dispersal.

Dispersal occurs by basidiospores only and the most common way they are dispersed in this cycle is wind blown dispersal. The wind blown basidiospores are produced parthenogenically which is reproduction from an ovum without fertilization. In white rot, the infection occurs from spores landing near the wounds or the transmission of mycelial fragments by wood sap. The rot extension spreads extremely fast in the first years after infection but spreads even quicker if the injuries are at the root collar are infected rather than the stem.

Habitat, distribution, and ecology

The fungus causes a brown heart rot, resulting in wood that is a light brown to red-brown color, and dry, with a stringy texture. A cross-section of infected wood reveals a circular infection around the center of the log. It enter opens wounds of plants caused by mechanical damage or by grazing wildlife. Fragments of mycelia can be spread by wood wasps (genus Sirex). It has also been recorded on balsam fir, Douglas fir, and western hemlock. The fungus is widespread in distribution, and has been recorded from North America, Europe, east Africa, New Zealand, and Australia.

Management
Prevention of the halos caused by Stereum sanguinolentum can be accomplished by carefully harvesting trees assuring no injuries occur. If injuries occur, treat the wounds with wound dressing.

References

External links

Fungal conifer pathogens and diseases
Fungi described in 1805
Fungi of Africa
Fungi of Australia
Fungi of Europe
Fungi of New Zealand
Fungi of North America
Stereaceae
Taxa named by Johannes Baptista von Albertini
Taxa named by Lewis David de Schweinitz